Year 1098 (MXCVIII) was a common year starting on Friday (link will display the full calendar) of the Julian calendar.

Events 
 By place 

 First Crusade 
 February 9 – Battle of the Lake of Antioch: The Crusaders under Bohemond I defeat a Seljuk relief force (some 12,000 men) led by Sultan Fakhr al-Mulk Radwan of Aleppo. Bohemond gathers 700 knights, and marches in the night to ambush the Seljuk Turks at the Lake of Antioch (modern Turkey). After several successful cavalry charges the Crusaders rout the Seljuk army, forcing Radwan to retreat back to Aleppo. 
 March 10 – Baldwin of Boulogne enters Edessa, and is welcomed as liberator by the Armenian clergy. The local population massacres the Seljuk garrison and officials – or forces them to flee. Baldwin is acknowledged as their ruler (or doux). He assumes the title of count and establishes the first crusader state. Baldwin marries Arda of Armenia,  daughter of Lord Thoros of Marash, and consolidates his conquered territory.
 June 3 – Siege of Antioch: The Crusaders under Bohemond I capture Antioch after a 8-month siege. He established secret contact with Firouz, an Armenian guard who controlled the "Tower of the Two Sisters". He opened the gates and Bohemond entered the city. Thousands of Christians are massacred along with Muslims. Bohemond is named Prince of Antioch (under protest) and creates the Principality of Antioch. 
 June 5 – Battle of Antioch: Emir Kerbogha, ruler (atabeg) of Mosul, arrives at Antioch with a Seljuk army (35,000 men) to relieve the city. He lays siege to the Crusaders who have just captured the city themselves (although they do not have full control of it). A Byzantine relief force led by Emperor Alexios I Komnenos turns back after Count Stephen of Blois convinces them that the situation in Antioch is hopeless.
 June 28 – Following the Holy Lance discovery by Peter Bartholomew in Antioch, the Crusaders under Bohemond I (leaving only 200 men) sortie from the city and defeat the Seljuk army. Kerbogha is forced to withdraw to Mosul, the garrison in the citadel surrenders to Bohemond personally (who raises his banner above the city) and the Crusaders occupy Antioch. The Crusade is delayed for the rest of the year.  
 July 14 – Donation of Altavilla: Bohemond I grants commercial privileges and the right to use warehouses (fondaco) to the Republic of Genoa. This marks the beginning of Italian merchant settlements in the Levant.
 August 1 – Adhemar of Le Puy (or Aimar), French bishop and nominal leader of the First Crusade, dies during an epidemic (probably typhus). With this, Rome's direct control over the Crusade effectively ends.
 August – Fatimid forces under Caliph Al-Musta'li recapture Jerusalem and occupy Palestine. The Crusaders threaten the borders of the Fatimid Caliphate which already has lost the Emirate of Sicily (see 1091).
 December 12 – Siege of Ma'arra: The Crusaders capture the city of Ma'arra after a month's siege and massacre part of the population. Short of supplies, the army is accused of widespread cannibalism.

 Britain 
 June or July – Battle of Anglesey Sound: A Norwegian fleet led by King Magnus Barefoot reverses an Anglo-Norman invasion of North Wales. Magnus conquers the Orkney Islands, the Hebrides and the Isle of Man.
 King Edgar of Scotland signs a treaty with Magnus III in which he agrees that the northern territories including the Hebrides belong to Norway. At Dunfermline Abbey, Edgar seeks support from Anselm of Canterbury.

 By topic 

 Religion 
 March 21 – Cîteaux Abbey, located in Saint-Nicolas-lès-Cîteaux, is founded by Robert of Molesme, founder of the Cistercian Order.
 October – The Council of Bari presided by Pope Urban II discusses relations between the Western and the Eastern Church.

Births 
 Amadeus I, Swiss nobleman (House of Geneva) (d. 1178)
 Ayn al-Quzat Hamadani, Persian philosopher and poet (d. 1131)
 Hedwig of Gudensberg, German countess and regent (d. 1148)
 Hildegard of Bingen, German Benedictine abbess (d. 1179)
 John of the Grating, French bishop and saint (d. 1163)
 Pons, French nobleman (House of Toulouse) (d. 1137)
 Simon II de Senlis, Earl of Huntingdon-Northampton, Anglo-Norman nobleman (d. 1153)
 Wibald, German abbot and councillor (d. 1158)

Deaths 
 January 3 – Walkelin, Norman bishop of Winchester
 February 22 – Hugh de Grandmesnil, Norman sheriff (b. 1032)
 July 31 – Hugh of Montgomery, 2nd Earl of Shrewsbury
 August 1 – Adhemar of Le Puy, French bishop (b. 1045)
 Alan the Black, Norman nobleman and lord of Richmond
 Baldwin II, count of Hainaut (House of Flanders) (b. 1056)
 Ephraim of the Caves, Kievan bishop of Pereiaslav
 Raymond IV (Raimundus), count of Pallars Jussà
 Robert de Say (Fitz-Picot), Norman nobleman
 Vinayaditya, Indian king of the Hoysala Empire
 Walo II of Chaumont-en-Vexin (or Galon II de Beaumont), viscount and constable of France (b. 1060)
 Yaghi Siyan, Sejuk governor of Antioch (b. 1011)

References